Jean-Marc Thibault (1923–2017) was a French film and television actor. He also directed three films.

Selected filmography
 First on the Rope (1944)
 Cage of Girls (1949)
 I Like Only You (1949)
 Women of Paris (1953)
 Wonderful Mentality (1953)
 Open Letter (1953)
 Service Entrance (1954)
 Death on the Run (1954)
 Les Assassins du dimanche (1956)
 Napoleon II, the Eagle (1961)
 We Will Go to Deauville (1962)
 Virginie (1962)
 The Woman Cop (1980)
 Mon Curé Chez les Nudistes (1982)
 Vidocq (2001)
 Mademoiselle Chambon (2009)

References

External links

Bibliography
 Halliwell, Leslie. Halliwell's Film Guide. Harper & Row, 1989.

1923 births
2017 deaths
French male film actors
20th-century French male actors
People from Yonne